Myrmex may refer to:

Myrmex (beetle), a genus of beetles in the family Curculionidae, Snout and Bark beetles
Myrmex, former name of the genus of ants now called Pseudomyrmex
Myrmex (mythology) may refer to different figures in Greek mythology